Jump Up – 9492 is Joey Yung's fourth Mandarin album. The number 9492 is a phonetic pun on the phrase "This is Joey".

Track listing
"愛情復興" Love Renaissance
"飆汗" Sweating (feat. Show Luo)
"別說愛我"  Don't Say You Love Me
"Funky Underground"
"棄權" Renunciation
"Highway 2U"
"極端愛我" Love Me Extremely
"隱形情人" Invisible Lover
"叢林" Deep Forest 
"用一千雙手臂擁抱你" Wrap You in a Thousand Arms

Joey Yung albums
2006 albums
Mandarin-language albums